Rheumatism root is a common name for several plants and may refer to:
 Apocynum cannabinum, also known as dogbane, Amy root, hemp dogbane, Indian hemp, or wild cotton
 Chimaphila maculata, also known as spotted wintergreen
 Jeffersonia, also known as twinleaf